The Guimet Museum (full name in ; MNAAG) is an art museum located at 6, place d'Iéna in the 16th arrondissement of Paris, France. Literally translated into English, its full name is the National Museum of Asian Arts-Guimet, or Guimet National Museum of Asian Arts. 

The museum has one of the largest collections of Asian art outside of Asia.

History

Founded by Émile Étienne Guimet, an industrialist, the museum first opened at Lyon in 1879 but was later transferred to Paris, opening in the place d'Iéna in 1889. Devoted to travel, Guimet was in 1876 commissioned by the minister of public instruction to study the religions of the Far East, and the museum contains many of the fruits of this expedition, including a fine collection of Chinese and Japanese porcelain and objects relating not merely to the religions of the East, but also to those of ancient Egypt, Greece and Rome. One of its wings, the Panthéon Bouddhique, displays Buddhist artworks.

Some of the museum's artifacts, originating from Cambodia, are connected with the studies conducted by the first scholars to be interested in Khmer culture, Louis Delaporte and Etienne Aymonier. They sent examples of Khmer art to France at a time when museums were not existing in Southeast Asia, with the agreement of the King of Cambodia, to show to Europe the high level of the ancient Khmer culture.

From December 2006 to April 2007, the museum harboured collections of the Kabul Museum, with archaeological pieces from the Greco-Bactrian city of Ai-Khanoum, and the Indo-Scythian treasure of Tillia Tepe.

Works of art of the museum

Greco-Buddhist art

Serindian art

Chinese art

Indian art

Southeast Asian art

See also 
 List of museums in Paris

Notes

External links

 Musée Guimet
Musée national des arts Asiatiques Guimet, special issue of art magazine Connaissance des Arts, available in French and English

National museums of France
Asian art museums in France
Asian-French culture
Art museums and galleries in Paris
Buildings and structures in the 16th arrondissement of Paris
Art museums established in 1879
1879 establishments in France